William Barton Wade Dent (September 8, 1806 – September 7, 1855) was an American politician, educator, soldier and businessman from Georgia. He represented Georgia in the U.S. Congress (1853–1855).

Early life
Dent was born in Bryantown, Maryland, in 1806 and attended Charlotte Hall Military Academy in Charlotte Hall, Maryland. He graduated from Charlotte Hall Military Academy in 1823 and moved the next year to Mallorysville in Wilkes County, Georgia, and taught school.

Career
In 1827, Dent pursued mercantile interests in Bullsboro, Georgia. He was also a key founding member of the city of Newnan, Georgia, in 1828. Dent pursued farming and milling in Coweta, Carroll and Heard Counties. He also did business in land holdings in Alabama, Georgia, Arkansas, Tennessee and Texas. Dent also served as a colonel in the Georgia Militia during the Creek War.

In 1843, Dent served in the Georgia House of Representatives. He returned to Newnan in 1849 and presided as judge of the inferior court of Coweta County. In 1852, he was elected as a Democratic Representative of Georgia's 4th congressional district to the 33rd United States Congress and served one term from March 4, 1853, to March 3, 1855. He did not run for reelection to the 34th Congress in 1854.

Personal life
Dent was married to Sarah Elizabeth Hinton.

In the 1850 U.S. Census, Dent was listed as having land holdings valued at $50,000.

Dent died in Newnan on September 7, 1855, and was buried in Oak Hill Cemetery in Newnan, Georgia.

References

1806 births
1855 deaths
Democratic Party members of the Georgia House of Representatives
Georgia (U.S. state) lawyers
People of the Creek War
People from Bryantown, Maryland
Charlotte Hall Military Academy alumni
Democratic Party members of the United States House of Representatives from Georgia (U.S. state)
People from Newnan, Georgia
American slave owners
19th-century American politicians